William Charles Good (February 24, 1876 – November 16, 1967), also known as W. C. Good, was a Canadian politician and leader of the farmers' and co-operative movement in Canada.

Good  the executive of the Farmers' Association in 1904. A proponent of farmers' unity, he helped found the Canadian Council of Agriculture in 1909 with Ernest Charles Drury and E. A. Partridge and helped organize the United Farmers of Ontario and its co-operative arm in 1914.

Good was a  member of the Progressive Party of Canada and was elected to the House of Commons of Canada in 1921 as one of its MPs and served until 1925 representing the riding of Brant. He was an advocate of electoral reform, tariff reform, temperance and banking reform.

In June 1922, he introduced legislation in the House of Commons that would have seen Instant-runoff voting used in each riding where more than two candidates were competing and he also called for demonstration multi-member districts in to provide experience of [proportional representation]]. However the bill was talked out and nothing was changed. (Canada is now only major country to use only First past the post in its elections.) 

He was elected president of the Co-operative Union of Canada in 1921, retaining that office until 1945. He was a founding member of the Ginger Group of radical MPs in 1924.

An Ontario Historical Plaque was erected in front of the Myrtleville House museum in Brantford, Ontario, by the province to commemorate William Charles Good's role in Ontario's heritage.

Archives 
There is a William Charles Good fonds at Library and Archives Canada. Archival reference number is R4238.

Electoral record

References

Footnotes

Bibliography

External links
 

1876 births
1967 deaths
Canadian Christian socialists
Canadian cooperative organizers
Ginger Group MPs
Members of the House of Commons of Canada from Ontario
Members of the United Church of Canada
Progressive Party of Canada MPs